The Indian locomotive class XP was a class of experimental  "Pacific" type steam locomotives used on  broad gauge lines in India.

The two members of the class were built by Vulcan Foundry in Newton-le-Willows, Lancashire, England, to an order placed by the Great Indian Peninsula Railway (GIPR) in 1935.

Background
The class XP was intended to have the power of the class XC heavy passenger Pacific locomotives, but the operating area of the light axle load class XB Pacifics.

Both of these objectives were very ambitious for the time.

Design details
The basis for the class XP design was the boiler and firebox of the XB, with some modification to their details.  The wheels and cylinders of the two classes had the same dimensions.

The XP's boiler pressure was higher, and its tractive effort was greater, than those of both the XB and the XC.

Both class XP locomotives were fitted with Caprotti valve gear, and roller bearings on all engine and tender wheels.  The class leader's bearings were supplied by Timken, and its class mate's bearings were by Skefco.

In 1946, when the Indian government ordered the 16 class WP prototypes, their design was based on that of the class XP.

Service history
The class XP locomotives entered service with the GIPR in 1937, as nos. 3100 and 3101.

The class leader was named King George, in honour of the then King-Emperor of India, and the other class XP engine was named Queen Elizabeth, after the then Queen-Empress.

In November 1951, the GIPR was incorporated into the Central Railway zone of the Indian Railways.  In the All-India renumbering of 1957, the two class XP locomotives were given the numbers 22599 and 22600, respectively.

Both locomotives had been withdrawn from service by 1970.

See also

Rail transport in India#History
Indian Railways
Locomotives of India

References

Notes

Bibliography

External links

 – features a works photo of a class XP locomotive

Railway locomotives introduced in 1937
XP
Vulcan Foundry locomotives
4-6-2 locomotives
5 ft 6 in gauge locomotives
Passenger locomotives
Scrapped locomotives